Atlético de Lugones Sociedad Deportiva is a Spanish football club based in Lugones in the autonomous community of Asturias. Founded in 2003, they play in Primera RFFPA, holding home matches at Estadio Santa Bárbara.

History
The first Atlético de Lugones CF was founded in 1905, but the current club was created in 2003 after the dissolution of the old club. It also has a track and field section.

The club promoted to Tercera División for the first time in 2012.

Season to season

6 seasons in Tercera División

External links
Official website  
Profile at futbolme.com

Football clubs in Asturias
Association football clubs established in 2003
2003 establishments in Spain
Multi-sport clubs in Spain